Jacob Gilyard (born July 14, 1998) is an American professional basketball player for the Memphis Hustle of the NBA G League. He played college basketball for the Richmond Spiders. Gilyard is the all-time NCAA career steals leader, breaking the previous record of 385 on December 5, 2021, and finishing his career with 466 steals.

High school career
Gilyard played basketball for The Barstow School in Kansas City, Missouri under the coaching of former National Basketball Association (NBA) player Billy Thomas. As a sophomore, he helped win the Missouri Class 3 state championship, his program's first state title since 1995, after scoring 16 points in a 61–46 win over Strafford High School. On December 5, 2016, during his senior season, Gilyard scored a school-record 50 points in an 85–47 victory over Washington High School. He finished the season averaging 33.2 points and seven assists per game, was named Class 3 Player of the Year and won the DiRenna Award as the top player in the Kansas City area. A three-star recruit, Gilyard committed to play collegiately for Richmond on September 12, 2016. He did not receive any offers from Power Five programs.

College career

On December 10, 2017, Gilyard scored a freshman season-high 23 points with five three-pointers in a 74–71 win over James Madison. He made the game-winning three-pointer with 0.4 seconds left. On February 28, 2018, Gilyard recorded 13 points, six assists and three steals in a 90–65 win over UMass, surpassing Kenny Atkinson's school freshman assist record and becoming the first NCAA Division I freshman to reach 80 steals since Oklahoma State's Marcus Smart in 2013. He closed the season with 89 steals, breaking the program record previously held by Anthony Dobbins. As a freshman, Gilyard averaged 11.4 points, 4.1 assists and 2.8 steals per game, which ranked sixth in the country, and started in all 32 games.

In the third game of his sophomore season, on November 16, 2018, Gilyard scored a season-high 31 points, 27 of which came in the second half, and recorded six assists in a 78–70 victory over IUPUI. On February 11, 2019, he was named Atlantic 10 Conference Player of the Week for his first time after averaging 22.5 points, 5.5 assists and five steals per game in wins over George Mason and George Washington. Gilyard averaged 16.2 points, 5.2 assists and 2.8 steals per game as a sophomore, earning second-team All-Atlantic 10 and Atlantic 10 All-Defensive Team honors. He joined Allen Iverson and Jason Kidd as the only Division I players since 1992 to record at least 868 points, 290 assists and 177 steals by the end of their sophomore seasons.

On November 18, 2019, Gilyard was recognized as Atlantic 10 Co-Player of the Week after averaging 22.0 points, 5.5 assists and four steals per game in victories over Vanderbilt and Cal State Northridge. On December 9, he was again named conference Co-Player of the Week after averaging 16.5 points, 8.5 assists, six rebounds and five steals in wins over Hampton and South Alabama. Against Hampton, Gilyard registered his first double-double, with 18 points and a season-high 10 assists, and scored his 1,000th career point. On January 25, 2020, he scored a season-high 29 points in an 87–79 loss to seventh-ranked Dayton. As a junior, Gilyard was named Atlantic 10 Defensive Player of the Year and first-team All-Atlantic 10 after averaging 12.7 points, 5.7 assists, a Division I-high 3.2 steals and 3.1 rebounds per game. Following the season Gilyard declared for the 2020 NBA draft. On May 21, Gilyard announced he was withdrawing from the draft and returning for his senior season at Richmond.

Gilyard took advantage of the NCAA offer of an extra year of eligibility due to the impacts of the COVID-19 pandemic on college athletics, choosing to return for a fifth year. He was named to the Third Team All-Atlantic 10 as well as the All-Defensive Team.

Professional career

Memphis Hustle (2022–present)
On September 23, 2022, Gilyard signed with the Memphis Grizzlies of the National Basketball Association (NBA). On November 4, 2022, Gilyard was named to the opening night roster for the Memphis Hustle.

Career statistics

College

|-
| style="text-align:left;"| 2017–18
| style="text-align:left;"| Richmond
| 32 || 32 || 36.4 || .452 || .384 || .836 || 2.2 || 4.1 || 2.8 || .0 || 11.4
|-
| style="text-align:left;"| 2018–19
| style="text-align:left;"| Richmond
| 31 || 31 || 37.3 || .472 || .363 || .771 || 2.9 || 5.2 || 2.8 || .0 || 16.2
|-
| style="text-align:left;"| 2019–20
| style="text-align:left;"| Richmond
| 31 || 31 || 36.6 || .468 || .367 || .802 || 3.1 || 5.7 || 3.2 || .2 || 12.7
|-
| style="text-align:left;"| 2020–21
| style="text-align:left;"| Richmond
| 23 || 23 || 37.7 || .410 || .336 || .842 || 3.0 || 5.0 || 3.6 || .0 || 12.3
|-
| style="text-align:left;"| 2021–22
| style="text-align:left;"| Richmond
| 37 || 37 || 38.5 || .395 || .360 || .860 || 3.5 || 5.4 || 2.9 || .2 || 13.3
|- class="sortbottom"
| style="text-align:center;" colspan="2"| Career
| 154 || 154 || 37.3 || .439 || .362 || .820 || 2.9 || 5.1 || 3.0 || .1 || 13.2

Personal life
Gilyard's father, Rodney, played basketball for Ottawa University at the National Association of Intercollegiate Athletics (NAIA) level and left as the program's all-time leader in assists and steals. Rodney is a member of the school's Athletics Hall of Fame.

See also
List of NCAA Division I men's basketball season steals leaders
List of NCAA Division I men's basketball career steals leaders

References

External links
Richmond Spiders bio

1998 births
Living people
American men's basketball players
Basketball players from Kansas City, Missouri
Point guards
Richmond Spiders men's basketball players